The Authentic Socialist Party is a political party in Senegal. The party was founded by Souty Touré, the current mayor of Tambacounda and a former government minister under Abdou Diouf.

History
In the 2007 elections the party received 1.5% of the national vote and won a single seat in the National Assembly. In the 2012 elections the party received just 0.5% of the vote and lost its single seat.

References

Political parties in Senegal
Political parties with year of establishment missing
Socialist parties in Senegal
Tambacounda Region